The Community School of Auchterarder (TCSoA) (formerly Auchterarder High School) is a small to medium-sized school with a nursery, primary and secondary department located in Auchterarder, Perth and Kinross, Scotland. The school also contains a modern leisure complex consisting of a large indoor hall and outside all-weather courts, which is also home to Auchterarder Gymnastics Club.

The school continues to grow with more than 500 pupils in both Primary and Secondary. The building of various housing developments in the local area have contributed to the increasing roll. In addition to the Primary pupils within the Community School of Auchterarder, the feeder schools for the Secondary are Dunning Primary, Aberuthven Primary and Blackford Primary.

The Community School Auchterarder is led by a Senior Management Team of seven:

 David Lambert - Head Teacher
 Kathryn Dalrymple - Depute Head Teacher
 Wendy MacDonald - Depute Head Teacher
 Kara McKillop - Depute Head Teacher
 Mark Rushton - Depute Head Teacher
 Mark Stewart  - Depute Head Teacher
 Mark Stanhope - Business Manager

School rolls

External links 
 The Community School of Auchterarder
 Community School of Auchterarder's page on Scottish Schools Online

Secondary schools in Perth and Kinross
Primary schools in Perth and Kinross
Auchterarder